The men's 4 × 100 metre freestyle relay competition of the swimming events at the 1967 Pan American Games took place on 27 July at the Pan Am Pool. It was the first appearance of this event in the Pan American Games.

This race consisted of eight lengths of the pool. Each of the four swimmers completed two lengths of the pool. The first swimmer had to touch the wall before the second could leave the starting block.

Results
All times are in minutes and seconds.

Heats

Final 
The final was held on July 27.

References

Swimming at the 1967 Pan American Games